Saint Francis Xavier Roman Catholic Church, also known as St. Francis Xavier Church, is a historic Roman Catholic church building in the Toulminville neighborhood of Mobile, Alabama, United States.  It serves as the parish church for St. Francis Xavier Parish in the Roman Catholic Archdiocese of Mobile.  St. Francis Xavier Parish was established in 1868. The vernacular style building was completed in 1916, replacing a previous structure destroyed in a hurricane. It was placed on the National Register of Historic Places on July 3, 1991, as part of the Historic Roman Catholic Properties in Mobile Multiple Property Submission.

References

National Register of Historic Places in Mobile, Alabama
Churches on the National Register of Historic Places in Alabama
Roman Catholic churches in Mobile, Alabama
Roman Catholic Archdiocese of Mobile
Roman Catholic churches in Alabama
Roman Catholic churches completed in 1916
Religious organizations established in 1868
20th-century Roman Catholic church buildings in the United States
African-American Roman Catholic churches